Sinchon Station is a station on Line 2 of the Seoul Metropolitan Subway in Mapo-gu, north of the Han River. It is located between Hongik University Station and Ewha Womans University Station.

It is the closest station to Sogang University, Yonsei University, Hyundai Department Store Sinchon, and Seoul Korea Temple. The area between the station and the front gate of Yonsei University is known simply as Sinchon-dong, and is a mecca of nightlife in Seoul, being packed with restaurants, pubs and bars that draw young adults from all over. This station is also in the vicinity of a bus terminal offering service to cities in northwestern Gyeonggi province, including Ilsan, Gimpo, and Ganghwa.

Station layout

References

Seoul Metropolitan Subway stations
Railway stations opened in 1984
Metro stations in Mapo District
Metro stations in Seodaemun District
1984 establishments in South Korea
20th-century architecture in South Korea